Lengpui Airport  is a domestic airport in Lengpui, serving Aizawl, the capital of Mizoram, India. The airport is connected by flights to Kolkata, Guwahati and Imphal, and is located at a distance of 32 km from Aizawl. Lengpui Airport is the first airport in the country to be built by the Government of Mizoram.

History

The airport was constructed at a cost of ₹ 979 crore, and was completed in a record time of two years and two months. The construction work started in December 1995 and completed in February 1998. The airport was expected to be able to cater to 300 incoming and outgoing passengers. With regards to land acquisition, it has been found out that about 65 percent of the area acquired, belonged to some high government officials and political leaders at Aizawl, who started buying plots from people in Lengpui village at very low prices. They then donated the land to the government for the airport for which the rich persons got much more compensation as donors than the actual farmers.
Previously, the airport was also served by Air Deccan which later became Kingfisher Red, but the airline stopped operating from the airport in April 2012.

Technical details
The 2,500-metre runway of the Lengpui airport is unique in that it has many hilly streams running underneath. The airport is one among the three airports in India that has a table top runway (others being Kozhikode and Mangalore) which creates an optical illusion that requires a very precise approach from the pilot. At present, Lengpui Airport has installed a Cat I instrument landing system, which will help planes land safely during low visibility conditions. A runway safety area and isolation parking bay are also planned. The Indian Air Force is planning to station at least 4 jet fighters at Lengpui airport.
Indian Oil handles the aviation fuel service department of Lengpui airport.

Airlines and destinations

Statistics

Helicopter Service

A Helicopter service by Pawan Hans  operating in Lengpui connects Aizawl with Lunglei, Lawngtlai, Saiha, Chawngte, Serchhip, Champhai, Kolasib, Khawzawl, Mamit and Hnahthial.

Accidents and incidents

 On 4 May 2011, a Northeast Shuttle's Cessna Caravan (VT-NES) crash landed at Lengpui airport, overshooting the runway. While there were no fatalities, the aircraft was damaged beyond repair and was written off. The officials at Lengpui airport attributed the mishap to rainfall coupled with strong winds reducing visibility during landing. However, the DGCA enquiry reported the cause of the accident to be "inadequate skill level of the pilot to execute a safe landing during marginal weather conditions". The pilot had failed to execute a stabilized approach. As a consequence the aircraft touched down well past the runway threshold, overshot the runway and fell into a ravine. The overshoot was a consequence of the pilot choosing to continue with the unstable approach, rather than going around to divert or make another approach. The DGCA also held the operator responsible for not ensuring that the pilot met the minimum regulatory requirements of the DGCA. The pilot was not cleared as per DGCA regulations to operate in airports situated in hilly terrain. The regulator also observed that the availability of a runway end safety area (RESA) and a functioning instrument landing system (ILS) would have increased the safety margin at the airport.

References

External links
Lengpui Airport at the AAI
Director General of Civil Aviation. (18/03/2019). APPROVED DOMESTIC SCHEDULE SUMMER. Aurbindo Marg, Opp. Safdarjung Airport, New Delhi 110003, INDIA

Transport in Aizawl
Airports established in 1998
Airports in Mizoram
1998 establishments in Mizoram
20th-century architecture in India